Thor is a Germanic god associated with thunder.

Thor may also refer to:

Arts and entertainment

Fictional characters and entities
 Thor (The Hitchhiker's Guide to the Galaxy)
 Thor (Stargate)
 Phecda Gamma Thor, from the anime Saint Seiya
 Thor, a playable character in Gauntlet
 Thor Lundgren, from Nurse Jackie
 Thorley "Thor" Callum, in the film Pursued

Film
Norse Mythology
 Legends of Valhalla: Thor, 2011 CGI animated feature film

Music
 Thor (band), a Canadian heavy metal band
 Thor (soundtrack), to the 2011 Marvel Studios film
 Thor (Wizard album), 2009

Marvel 

Thor (comics), various characters
Thor (Marvel Comics), most notable comic book character with this name
 Thor (Ultimate Marvel), the Ultimate Marvel version of the character
 Thor (Marvel Cinematic Universe), the 21st-century film version of the Marvel Comics character
 Thor (film), a 2011 American live-action superhero film based on the Marvel Comics character
 Thor: The Dark World, a 2013 American film sequel
 Thor: Ragnarok, a 2017 American film sequel
 Thor: Love and Thunder, a 2022 American film sequel
 Thor: Tales of Asgard, a 2011 American direct-to-video animated film based on the Marvel Comics character

Other media 
 Thor (sculpture), an outdoor work by Melvin Schuler in Portland, Oregon, US
 The History of Rome (podcast), often abbreviated THoR

Companies 
 Thor (motorcycles), American company founded 1901
 Thor Equities, a private equity corporation in New York City
 Thor Industries, world's largest manufacturer of recreational vehicles
 Thor Power Tool Company, a former U.S. manufacturer that was party to the 1979 U.S. Supreme Court Case Thor Power Tool Company v. Commissioner

Natural sciences 
 Thor (crustacean), a genus of shrimps
 Thor (volcano), an active volcano on Jupiter's moon Io
 Thorium, a chemical element
 Thor (1903), a Danish Research vessel 1903-1927

People 
 Thor (given name), including a list of individuals with the name Thor

Surname 
 Brad Thor, author
 Cameron Thor, film and TV actor
 Ebba Busch Thor, Swedish politician
 Jon Mikl Thor (born 1955), Canadian heavy metal singer and bodybuilder
 JT Thor, basketball player

Nickname 
 Bobby Nystrom, nicknamed "Thor", NHL ice hockey player
 Noah Syndergaard, nicknamed "Thor", MLB baseball player
 Hafþór Júlíus Björnsson, nicknamed "Thor", Icelandic strongman

Stage name 
 Thor (singer) (born 1982), Filipino singer, performer and songwriter
 Thor, early stage name for professional wrestler Kevin Wacholz
 Thor, a member of the TV show American Gladiators
 Thor/Thor "The Body" Olsen, a professional wrestler from NWA All-Star Wrestling
 The Mighty Thor, a professional wrestler in World Championship Wrestling who competed in SuperBrawl I
 "Finland Hellraiser" Thor, a stage name of professional wrestler Tony Halme

Places 
 Thor (volcano), an active volcano on Jupiter's moon Io
 Thor, Iowa, a small town in the United States
 Le Thor, a town in southern France
 Mount Thor, Baffin Island, Nunavut, Canada
 Mount Thor (Alaska), Chugach Mountains, Alaska, US
 Thor's Cave, in Staffordshire, England
 Thorland Peninsula, Greenland 
 Thor Fjord, Greenland

Animals
Thor (walrus), a walrus sighted in the Netherlands and the United Kingdom in 2022–23

Technology

Computing
 THOR (trading platform), an electronic trading platform
 Thor (video codec), a candidate for the development of an open and royalty free next-generation video coding standard
 CST Thor, a series of personal computers designed by Cambridge Systems Technology
 Thor-CD, a recordable CD format proposed in 1988 by Tandy but never released in commercial version

Weapons and military technology

Vessels
 German auxiliary cruiser Thor, a German surface raider in World War II
 HMS Thor, a cancelled British T-class submarine
 HNoMS Thor, three Royal Norwegian Navy warships
 ICGV Þór, the flagship of the Icelandic Coast Guard

Weapons
 PGM-17 Thor, an American intermediate range ballistic missile
 Bristol Thor, a ramjet engine used on the Bristol Bloodhound missile
 Project Thor, a theoretical US orbital kinetic bombardment weapons system
 Thor, an alternate name for the Karl-Gerät, a 600mm German mortar used in World War II
 THOR/Multi Mission System (MMS), a British Army vehicle-mounted Starstreak missile launcher
 "Thor", alternate name for the US Mark 7 nuclear bomb, the first US tactical nuclear bomb

Other military technology
 Theatre History of Operations Reports, a U.S. Air Force database endeavoring to catalog every bomb dropped by the US military since World War I
 Thor III, a man-portable device for remote-controlled IED jamming

Other technologies
 Thor (rocket family), a space launch vehicle derived from the PGM-17
 Thor (satellite) (previously known as Marcopolo), a satellite constellation owned by Telenor
 THOR, a type of crash test dummy
 Thor 1-A, a version of the Thor T/A ultralight aircraft
 Thor washing machine, the first electric clothes washer sold commercially in the United States
 Daihatsu Thor, a mini multi-purpose vehicle sold in Japan

See also 
 Thaw (disambiguation)
 Tor (disambiguation)